Algericeras is an extinct Ammonite genus belonging to the Acathoceratacea that lived during the Cenomanian stage at the beginning of the Late Cretaceous in what is now Mexico.

Algericeras is included in the acathoceratacean family Brancoceratidae and subfamily Mortonoceratinae. Species include Algericeras (Sakondryella) remolinense and  Algericeras proratum

References
 Algericeras-Paleodb
 W. J. Kennedy and C. W. Wright. 1981. Euhystrichoceras and Algericeras, the Last Mortoniceratine ammonites. Palaeontology 24(2):417-435 

Ammonitida genera
Acanthoceratoidea
Late Cretaceous ammonites
Late Cretaceous ammonites of North America
Cretaceous Mexico
Late Cretaceous cephalopods of North America
Fossils of Mexico
Cenomanian life